Oxytrichidae is a family of ciliates in the order Sporadotrichida. Oxytrichidae are morphologically diverse, ranging in length from 40 micrometres (e.g. Oxytricha setigera) to 400 micrometers (e.g. Coniculostomum monilata). They are generally elliptical in shape with some very flexible while others are rigid. Like other ciliates, Oxytrichidae have two or more nuclei: a large macronucleus that generally stretches across much of the cell body, and one or more smaller micronuclei.

References 

Spirotrichea
Ciliate families
Taxa named by Christian Gottfried Ehrenberg